"Straight to My Feet" is a single performed by hip-hop artist Hammer that was released as the theme song to the 1994 film Street Fighter. The song reached number 57 in the UK charts.

Reception
The song received a mostly negative reception from critics.

Charts

References

1994 singles
1990 songs
MC Hammer songs
Songs written by MC Hammer
Capitol Records singles
Film theme songs